The Titanic Museum is a two-story museum shaped like the RMS Titanic. It is located in Pigeon Forge, Tennessee and opened on April 8, 2010. It is built half-scale to the original ship. Similar to the one in Branson, Missouri, the museum holds 400 pre-discovery artifacts in twenty galleries. It is the largest permanent Titanic museum in the world.

The structure is built in a pool to create the illusion of the Titanic at sea, and the 2-hour, self-guided tour is designed to give guests the sensation of being an original passenger on the Titanics 1912 maiden voyage.

As guests enter, they are given a passenger boarding ticket. On this ticket is the name of an actual Titanic passenger and the class they were traveling. Guests will learn the individual stories of several passengers. In the Titanic Memorial Room, they will find out whether their ticketed passenger survived.

The structure cost $25 million to build.

References

External links
Titanic Pigeon Forge - official site

Maritime museums in Tennessee
Museums in Sevier County, Tennessee
RMS Titanic memorials
Pigeon Forge, Tennessee
Museums established in 2010
2010 establishments in Tennessee